The 1973 KFK competitions in Ukraine were part of the 1973 Soviet KFK competitions that were conducted in the Soviet Union. It was 10th season of the KFK in Ukraine since its introduction in 1964.

First stage

Group 1

Group 2

Group 3

Group 4

Group 5

Group 6

Final

Notes FC Shakhtar Sverdlovsk withdrew before the final stage.

Promotion
None of KFK teams were promoted to the 1974 Soviet Second League, Zone 6.
 FC Hranyt Cherkasy

However, to the Class B were promoted following teams that did not participate in the KFK competitions:
 none

References

Ukrainian Football Amateur League seasons
4
Soviet
Soviet
football